Soltanabad Rural District is a rural district (dehestan) in the Central District of Ramhormoz County, Khuzestan Province, Iran. At the 2006 census, its population was 5,612, in 1,070 families.  the rural district has 21 villages.

References 

Rural Districts of Khuzestan Province
Ramhormoz County